Pak Tam Au is an area within the Sai Kung East Country Park, on the Sai Kung Peninsula in the New Territories of Hong Kong. It is administratively under the Tai Po District.

Village
The small village at Pak Tam Au is said to have a history dating back to the second half of the 17th century. It was first settled by members of the Ho and Chan families coming from Liaoning province. The Chans first settled in Ting Kok and then moved to the village. Historically, the villagers were mainly farmers growing rice and vegetable and rearing pigs and poultry. They collected firewood, which they sold to the lime and brick kilns in Pak Tam Chung.

Pak Tam Au is a recognized village under the New Territories Small House Policy.

Tourism
Pak Tam Au, located at the junction between stages 2 and 3 of the MacLehose Trail, is a popular starting point for hiking activities. It is also the site of a campsite managed by the Agriculture, Fisheries and Conservation Department.

Transportation
Pak Tam Au is served by Pak Tam Road and the Pak Tam Au bus stop.

References

External links

 Delineation of area of existing village Pak Tam Au (Sai Kung North) for election of resident representative (2019 to 2022)

Sai Kung District
Sai Kung Peninsula